Nicolo Gargano (1 November 1934 – 28 March 2016) was an English boxer, who won the bronze medal in the welterweight division (– 67 kg) at the 1956 Summer Olympics in Melbourne, Australia. He fought as Nicky Gargano.

Amateur career
Gargano won the 1954, 1955 and 1956 Amateur Boxing Association British welterweight title, when boxing for the Army and later the Covent Gardens ABC. In 1954 he won the gold medal in the welterweight category at the 1954 British Empire and Commonwealth Games.

Olympic results 
Defeated Eduard Borysov (Soviet Union) points
Defeated Francisco Gelabert (Argentina) points
Lost to Nicolae Linca (Romania) points

References

External links
 databaseOlympics

1934 births
2016 deaths
English male boxers
English people of Italian descent
Welterweight boxers
Commonwealth Games gold medallists for England
Boxers at the 1954 British Empire and Commonwealth Games
Boxers at the 1956 Summer Olympics
Olympic boxers of Great Britain
Olympic bronze medallists for Great Britain
Olympic medalists in boxing
Medalists at the 1956 Summer Olympics
Commonwealth Games medallists in boxing
England Boxing champions
Medallists at the 1954 British Empire and Commonwealth Games